Jadir (also Romanized as Jadīr; also known as Jadīd) is a village in Jolgah Rural District, in the Central District of Jahrom County, Fars Province, Iran. At the 2006 census, its population was 319, in 71 families.

References 

Populated places in Jahrom County